The North Sarawakan languages are a group of Austronesian languages spoken in the northeastern part of the province of Sarawak, Borneo, and proposed in Blust (1991, 2010).

North Sarawakan languages
Kenyah
Dayic languages (Apo Duat)
Berawan–Lower Baram
Bintulu

Ethnologue 16 adds Punan Tubu as an additional branch, and notes that Bintulu might be closest to Baram.  The Melanau–Kajang languages were removed in Blust 2010.

The Northern Sarawak languages are well known for strange phonological histories.

Classification
Smith (2017) classifies the North Sarawakan languages as follows.
Bintulu
Berawan–Lower Baram
Berawan (various dialects)
Lower Baram (Miri, Kiput, Narum, Belait, Lelak, Lemeting, Dali’)
Dayic
Kelabit (Bario, Pa’ Dalih, Tring, Sa’ban, Long Seridan, Long Napir)
Lun Dayeh (Long Bawan, Long Semadoh)
Kenyah
Highland (Lepo’ Gah, Lepo’ Tau, Lepo’ Sawa, Lepo’, Lepo’ Laang, Badeng, Lepo’ Jalan, Uma’ Baha, Uma’ Bem, Òma Lóngh)
Lowland
Eastern Lowland (Uma’ Pawe, Uma’ Timai, Lebo’ Kulit)
Western Lowland (Lebo’Vo’, Sebop, Penan (eastern and western varieties))

Footnotes

References

K. Alexander Adelaar and Nikolaus Himmelmann, The Austronesian languages of Asia and Madagascar. Routledge, 2005.